Kirikou and the Men and Women is a 2012 computer-animated children's film written and directed by Michel Ocelot. The second sequel to Ocelot's 1998 film Kirikou and the Sorceress, following Kirikou and the Wild Beasts (2005), the film is an anthology, telling five tales woven together by a loose framing device.

The film was originally released on 3 October 2012. While successful at the box office, it received mixed reviews from critics.

Synopsis
The third film by celebrated French animator Michel Ocelot about the exploits of the irrepressible young Kirikou, a feisty infant with a big heart, follows his adventures as he uses his wits to save his fellow villagers from a host of problems—including the threats of an evil sorceress. Told through the eyes of Kirikou’s grandfather, the Wise Man who lives in the Forbidden Mountain, the stories mix mythology, fable, and humor to teach important lessons about courage, self-belief, and tolerance.

Cast
 Romann Berrux: Kirikou
 Awa Sene Sarr: Karaba
 Sabine Pakora: Strong / Neutral Woman

Accolades

Notes

External links

 Official website of Michel Ocelot
 
 
 
 BBCi review
 The Guardian review

2010s children's fantasy films
2010s French animated films
2012 animated films
2012 films
French fantasy adventure films
Films based on fairy tales
Films directed by Michel Ocelot
Films set in Africa
French animated fantasy films
French anthology films
Luxembourgian animated fantasy films